The Topps Company, Inc. is an American company that manufactures chewing gum, candy, and collectibles. Formerly based in New York City, Topps is best known as a leading producer of American football, baseball, basketball, ice hockey, soccer, and other sports and non-sports themed trading cards. Topps also produces cards under the brand names Allen & Ginter and Bowman.

In the 2010s, Topps was the only baseball card manufacturer with a license with Major League Baseball. Following the loss of that license to Fanatics, Inc. in 2022; Fanatics acquired Topps in the same year.

Company history

Beginning and consolidation
Topps itself was founded in 1938, but the company can trace its roots back to an earlier firm, American Leaf Tobacco. Founded in 1890 by members of the Saloman family, the American Leaf Tobacco Co. imported tobacco to the United States and sold it to other tobacco companies. Eventually, in 1908, Morris Chigorinsky Shorin came in control of the company.

American Leaf Tobacco encountered difficulties during World War I, as it was cut off from Turkish supplies of tobacco, and later as a result of the Great Depression. Shorin's sons, Abram, Ira, Philip, and Joseph, decided to focus on a new product but take advantage of the company's existing distribution channels. To do this, they relaunched the company as Topps, with the name meant to indicate that it would be "tops" in its field. The chosen field was the manufacture of chewing gum, selected after going into the produce business was considered and rejected.

At the time, chewing gum was still a relative novelty sold in individual pieces. Topps's most successful early product was Bazooka bubble gum, which was packaged with a small comic on the wrapper. Starting in 1950, the company decided to try increasing gum sales by packaging them together with trading cards featuring Western character Hopalong Cassidy (William Boyd); at the time Boyd, as one of the biggest stars of early television, was featured in newspaper articles and on magazine covers, along with a significant amount of "Hoppy" merchandising. When Topps next introduced baseball cards as a product, the cards immediately became its primary emphasis.

The "father of the modern baseball card" was Sy Berger. In the autumn of 1951, Berger, then a 28-year-old veteran of World War II, designed the 1952 Topps baseball card set with Woody Gelman on the kitchen table of his apartment on Alabama Avenue in Brooklyn. The card design included a player's name, photo, facsimile autograph, team name and logo on the front; and the player's height, weight, bats, throws, birthplace, birthday, stats and a short biography on the back. The basic design is still in use today.  Berger would work for Topps for 50 years (1947–97) and serve as a consultant for another five, becoming a well-known figure on the baseball scene, and the face of Topps to major league baseball players, whom he signed up annually and paid in merchandise, like refrigerators and carpeting.

The Shorins, in recognition of his negotiation abilities, sent Sy to London in 1964 to negotiate the rights for Topps to produce Beatles trading cards. They also tried hockey. Arriving without an appointment, Sy succeeded by speaking in Yiddish to Brian Epstein, the Beatles’ manager.

Berger hired a garbage boat to remove leftover boxes of 1952 baseball cards stored in their warehouse, and rode with them as a tugboat pulled them off the New Jersey shore. The cards were then dumped into the Atlantic Ocean. The cards included Mickey Mantle's first Topps card, the most valuable card of the modern era. No one at the time, of course, knew the collector's value the cards would one day attain. On August 28, 2022, the Mickey Mantle baseball card (Topps; #311; SGC MT 9.5) was sold for $12.600 million.

Incorporation

The company began its existence as Topps Chewing Gum, Inc., a partnership between the four Shorin brothers. It later incorporated under New York law in 1947. The entire company originally operated at the Bush Terminal in Brooklyn, but production facilities were moved to a plant in Duryea, Pennsylvania, in 1965 (the Duryea plant closed in 1997). Corporate offices remained at 254 36th Street in Brooklyn, a location in the waterfront district by the Gowanus Expressway. In 1994, the headquarters relocated to One Whitehall Street in lower Manhattan.

After being privately held for several decades, Topps offered stock to the public for the first time in 1972 with the assistance of investment banking firm White, Weld & Co. The company returned to private ownership when it was acquired in a leveraged buyout led by Forstmann Little & Company in 1984. The new ownership group again made Topps into a publicly traded company in 1987, now renamed to The Topps Company, Inc. In this incarnation, the company was reincorporated under Delaware General Corporation Law for legal reasons, but company headquarters remained in New York. Management was left in the hands of the Shorin family throughout all of these maneuverings.

On October 12, 2007, Topps was acquired by Michael Eisner's The Tornante Company and Madison Dearborn Partners. Under Eisner's direction, Topps began to expand into the entertainment and media business with plans for a Bazooka Joe movie. Former television executive Staci Weiss was hired as Topps's head of entertainment to develop projects based on Topps properties, including Garbage Pail Kids, Wacky Packages, Dinosaurs Attack!, Mech Warrior and Attax.

Topps Digital
In 2012, Topps began creating digital sports cards, starting with the Topps Bunt baseball card mobile app. After releasing Bunt in 2013 and finding success with it, they expanded their sports card market into other apps including the Kick soccer app in August 2014, Huddle Football app in April 2016, and Skate hockey app in 2017.

Along with sports cards, Topps also expanded its marketplace for collectors of digital goods to include non-sports cards on mobile devices. In March 2015 they released their Star Wars: Card Trader app, and in May 2016 they released a Walking Dead trading card app. Following the success of their assortment of digital trading card apps, they once again expanded their marketplace for digital collectors a few years later, releasing a Marvel trading card app in the spring of 2019 and their Disney trading card app in November of that same year.

In March 2020, Topps announced a collaboration with WAX.io to make their cards tradable on the blockchain. As of December 2020, Topps has only made Garbage Pail Kids cards available to traders via blockchain but they have announced Alien Quadrilogy collectibles will be coming soon.

In April 2021, Topps announced plans to go public via a merger with Mudrick Capital Acquisition Corporation II, a publicly traded special purpose acquisition company (SPAC). Michael Eisner's firm The Tornante Company planned to roll its stake into the new company while Mudrick Capital would lead an additional investment of $250 million. The deal valued Topps at $1.3 billion. However, reports surfaced within six months of their initial plans that Mudrick Capital Management had backed out of the investment deal.

In August 2021, it was reported that Fanatics acquired future exclusive licenses with Major League Baseball and the MLB Players Association to produce baseball cards. In January 2022, Fanatics announced they had acquired Topps for US$500 million.

Topps Europe Ltd.

Purchase of Merlin

Topps has a European division, which is based in Milton Keynes, UK. From this office products are launched across Europe, including Spain, France, Germany, Norway, and Italy. This division also co-ordinates products launches across the many other international markets including the Far East, Australia, and South Africa.

In 1994 Merlin acquired the Premier League license allowing the company to exclusively publish the only official Premier League sticker and album collection in the UK.  The initial success of the Premier League stickers and album collection was so great that it took even Merlin by surprise, with reprint after reprint being produced.

In 1995, the Topps Company Inc. completed its takeover of Merlin Publishing. Merlin's official company name changed to Topps Europe Limited, but its products still carried the Merlin brand until 2008 as it was easily recognized by consumers.

Topps Europe Limited continues to produce a wide and varied range of sports and entertainment collectibles across Europe. Its range of products now includes stickers, albums, cards and binders, magazines, stationery, and temporary tattoos.

Topps Europe Ltd. products
Topps Europe Ltd. has continued to launch hugely successful products across Europe. Some of the most successful licenses have included WWE, Pokémon, Doctor Who, High School Musical and SpongeBob.

Topps Merlin branded Premier League sticker albums have been popular since their launch in 1994, and in 2007 Topps acquired the Premier League rights for trading cards. Previously, the trading card rights were held by Magic Box International who produced the Shoot Out cards from the 2003/04 to 2006/07 seasons. Match Attax, the official Premier League trading card game, was the biggest selling boys’ collectible in the UK three years running. Being sold across the globe in a number of countries, the collection also holds the title of the biggest selling sports collectible in the world. It is estimated that around 1.5 million children collect it in the UK alone.

Following on from the acquisition of Premier League trading cards rights, in the spring of 2008 Topps acquired the exclusive rights to the DFL Deutsche Fussball Liga GmbH for trading cards and stickers until the Bundesliga Season 2010/11. Bundesliga Match Attax was launched in January 2009 and is now available in over 40,000 stockists. The collection is the first of its kind in Germany and has become one of the biggest selling collections in the country.

As of February 2016 Topps Match Attax dominated the secondary UK card trading market occupying two out of the top three spots on the www.stickerpoints.com 'most popular soccer collection' list.

In January 2023, Topps released both physical and digital trading cards for their latest partner the 24 Hours of Le Mans Motorsport event. The release is set for February 2023 and will feature art work from original race posters from 1923 to current day.

Topps baseball cards: A history

Entry into the baseball card market
In 1951, Topps produced its first baseball cards in two different sets known today as Red Backs and Blue Backs. Each set contained 52 cards, like a deck of playing cards, and in fact the cards could be used to play a game that would simulate the events of a baseball game. Also like playing cards, the cards had rounded corners and were blank on one side, which was colored either red or blue (hence the names given to these sets). The other side featured the portrait of a player within a baseball diamond in the center, and in opposite corners a picture of a baseball together with the event for that card, such as "fly out" or "single."

Topps changed its approach in 1952, this time creating a much larger (407 total) set of baseball cards and packaging them with its signature product, bubble gum. The company also decided that its playing card model was too small (2 inches by 2-5/8 inches) and changed the dimensions to 2-5/8 inches by 3-3/4 inches with square corners. The cards now had a color portrait on one side, with statistical and biographical information on the other. This set became a landmark in the baseball card industry, and today the company considers this its first true baseball card set. Many of the oil paintings for the sets were rendered by artist Gerry Dvorak, who also worked as an animator for Famous Studios. In 1957, Topps shrank the dimensions of its cards slightly, to 2-1/2 inches by 3-1/2 inches, setting a standard that remains the basic format for most sports cards produced in the United States. It was at this time Topps began to use color photographs in their set.

The cards were released in several series over the course of the baseball season, a practice Topps would continue with its baseball cards until 1974. However, the last series of each year did not sell as well, as the baseball season wore on and popular attention began to turn towards American football. Thus cards from the last series are much scarcer and are typically more valuable (even commons) than earlier series of the same year. Topps was left with a substantial amount of surplus stock in 1952, which it largely disposed of by dumping many cards into the Atlantic. In later years, Topps either printed series in smaller quantities late in the season or destroyed excess cards. As a result, cards with higher numbers from this period are rarer than low numbers in the same set, and collectors will pay significantly higher prices for them. The last series in 1952 started with card No. 311, which is Topps's first card of Mickey Mantle, and remains the most valuable Topps card ever (and, as of August 28, 2022, the most valuable trading card of all). On August 28, 2022, the Mickey Mantle baseball card (Topps; #311; SGC MT 9.5) was sold for $12.600 million. This 1952 Topps Mantle is often mistakenly referred to as Mantle's rookie card, but that honor belongs to his 1951 Bowman card (which is worth less than the 1952 Topps card).

The combination of baseball cards and bubble gum was popular among young boys, and given the mediocre quality of the gum, the cards quickly became the primary attraction. In fact, the gum eventually became a hindrance because it tended to stain the cards, thus impairing their value to collectors who wanted to keep them in pristine condition. It (along with the traditional gray cardboard) was finally dropped from baseball card packs in 1992, although Topps began its Heritage line, which included gum, in the year 2001.

Competition for player contracts
During this period, baseball card manufacturers generally obtained the rights to depict players on merchandise by signing individual players to contracts for the purpose. Topps first became active in this process through an agent called Players Enterprises in July 1950, in preparation for its first 1951 set. The later acquisition of rights to additional players allowed Topps to release its second series.

This promptly brought Topps into furious competition with Bowman Gum, another company producing baseball cards. Bowman had become the primary maker of baseball cards and driven out several competitors by signing its players to exclusive contracts. The language of these contracts focused particularly on the rights to sell cards with chewing gum, which had already been established in the 1930s as a popular product to pair with baseball cards.

To avoid the language of Bowman's existing contracts, Topps sold its 1951 cards with caramel candy instead of gum. However, because Bowman had signed many players in 1950 to contracts for that year, plus a renewal option for one year, Topps included in its own contracts the rights to sell cards with gum starting in 1952 (as it ultimately did). Topps also tried to establish exclusive rights through its contracts by having players agree not to grant similar rights to others, or renew existing contracts except where specifically noted in the contract.

Bowman responded by adding chewing gum "or confections" to the exclusivity language of its 1951 contracts, and also sued Topps in U.S. federal court. The lawsuit alleged infringement on Bowman's trademarks, unfair competition, and contractual interference. The court rejected Bowman's attempt to claim a trademark on the word "baseball" in connection with the sale of gum, and disposed of the unfair competition claim because Topps had made no attempt to pass its cards off as being made by Bowman. The contract issue proved more difficult because it turned on the dates when a given player signed contracts with each company, and whether the player's contract with one company had an exception for his contract with the other.

As the contract situation was sorted out, several Topps sets during these years had a few "missing" cards, where the numbering of the set skips several numbers because they had been assigned to players whose cards could not legally be distributed. The competition, both for consumer attention and player contracts, continued until 1956, when Topps bought out Bowman. This left Topps as the predominant producer of baseball cards for the next quarter-century.

Consolidation of a monopoly
The next company to challenge Topps was Fleer, another gum manufacturer. Fleer signed star Ted Williams to an exclusive contract in 1959 and sold a set of cards oriented around him. Williams retired the next year, so Fleer began adding around him other mostly retired players in a Baseball Greats series, which was sold with gum. Two of these sets were produced before Fleer finally tried a 67-card set of currently active players in 1963. However, Topps held onto the rights of most players and the set was not particularly successful.

Stymied, Fleer turned its efforts to supporting an administrative complaint filed by the Federal Trade Commission, alleging that Topps was engaging in unfair competition through its aggregation of exclusive contracts. A hearing examiner ruled against Topps in 1965, but the Commission reversed this decision on appeal. The Commission concluded that because the contracts only covered the sale of cards with gum, competition was still possible by selling cards with other small, low-cost products. However, Fleer chose not to pursue such options and instead sold its remaining player contracts to Topps for $395,000 in 1966. The decision gave Topps an effective monopoly of the baseball card market.

That same year, however, Topps faced an attempt to undermine its position from the nascent players' union, the Major League Baseball Players Association. Struggling to raise funds, the MLBPA discovered that it could generate significant income by pooling the publicity rights of its members and offering companies a group license to use their images on various products. After putting players on Coca-Cola bottlecaps for $120,000, the union concluded that the Topps contracts did not pay players adequately for their rights.

MLBPA executive director Marvin Miller then approached Joel Shorin, the president of Topps, about renegotiating these contracts. At this time, Topps had every major league player under contract, generally for five years plus renewal options, so Shorin declined. After continued discussions went nowhere, the union before the 1968 season asked its members to stop signing renewals on these contracts, and offered Fleer the exclusive rights to market cards of most players (with gum) starting in 1973. Although Fleer declined the proposal, by the end of the year Topps had agreed to double its payments to each player from $125 to $250, and also to begin paying players a percentage of Topps's overall sales. The figure for individual player contracts has since increased to $500.

As a byproduct of this history, Topps continues to use individual player contracts as the basis for its baseball card sets today. This contrasts with other manufacturers, who all obtain group licenses from the MLBPA. The difference has occasionally affected whether specific players are included in particular sets. Players who decline to sign individual contracts will not have Topps cards even when the group licensing system allows other manufacturers to produce cards of the player, as happened with Alex Rodriguez early in his career. On the other hand, if a player opts out of group licensing, as Barry Bonds did in 2004, then manufacturers who depend on the MLBPA system will have no way of including him. Topps, however, can negotiate individually and was belatedly able to create a 2004 card of Bonds. In addition, Topps is the only manufacturer able to produce cards of players who worked as replacement players during the 1994 baseball strike, since they are barred from union membership and participation in the group licensing program.

The monopoly and its end
A semblance of competition returned to the baseball card market in the 1970s when Kellogg's began producing "3-D" cards and inserting them in boxes of breakfast cereal (originally Corn Flakes, later Raisin Bran and other Kellogg's brands). The Kellogg's sets contained fewer cards than Topps sets, and the cards served as an incentive to buy the cereal, rather than being the intended focus of the purchase, as tended to be the case for cards distributed with smaller items like candy or gum. Topps took no action to stop them.

The Topps monopoly on baseball cards was finally broken by a lawsuit decided by federal judge Clarence Charles Newcomer in 1980, in which the judge ended Topps Chewing Gum's exclusive right to sell baseball cards, allowing the Fleer Corporation to compete in the market. That let Fleer and another company, Donruss, enter the market in 1981. Fleer and Donruss began making large, widely distributed sets to compete directly with Topps, packaged with gum. When the ruling was overturned on appeal in August 1981, Topps appeared to have regained its monopoly, but both of its competitors instead began packaging their cards with other baseball items—logo stickers from Fleer, and cardboard puzzle pieces from Donruss.  The puzzles, created by baseball artists Dick Perez for Perez Steele, included Warren Spahn, Hank Aaron, Mickey Mantle and a dozen others. Other manufacturers later followed, but Topps remains one of the leading brands in the baseball card hobby. In response to the competition, Topps began regularly issuing additional "Traded" sets featuring players who had changed teams since the main set was issued, following up on an idea it had experimented with a few years earlier.

Topps in the modern baseball card industry
While "Traded" or "Update" sets were originally conceived to deal with players who changed teams, they became increasingly important for another reason. In order to fill out a 132-card set (the number of cards that fit on a single sheet of the uncut cardboard used in the production process), it would contain a number of rookie players who had just reached the major leagues and not previously appeared on a card. They also included a few single cards of players who previously appeared in the regular set on a multi-player "prospects" card; one notable example is the 1982 Topps Traded Cal Ripken Jr. Since a "rookie card" is typically the most valuable for any given player, the companies now competed to be the first to produce a card of players who might be future stars. Increasingly, they also included highly touted minor league players who had yet to play in the major leagues. For example, Topps obtained a license to produce cards featuring the U.S. Olympic baseball team and thus produced the first card of Mark McGwire prior to his promotion to the major league level, and one that would become quite valuable to collectors for a time. This card from the 1984 squad appeared in Topps's regular 1985 set, but by the next Olympic cycle the team's cards had been migrated to the "Traded" set. As a further step in this race, Topps resurrected its former competitor Bowman as a subsidiary brand in 1989, with Bowman sets similarly chosen to include a lot of young players with bright prospects.

Also beginning in 1989 with the entry of Upper Deck into the market, card companies began to develop higher-end cards using improved technology. Following Topps's example, other manufacturers now began to diversify their product lines into different sets, each catering to a different niche of the market. The initial Topps effort at producing a premium line of cards, in 1991, was called Stadium Club. Topps continued adding more sets and trying to distinguish them from each other, as did its competitors. The resulting glut of different baseball sets caused the MLBPA to take drastic measures as the market for them deteriorated. The union announced that for 2006, licenses would only be granted to Topps and Upper Deck, the number of different products would be limited, and players would not appear on cards before reaching the major leagues.

Although most of its products were distributed through retail stores and hobby shops, Topps also attempted to establish itself online, where a significant secondary market for sports cards was developing. Working in partnership with eBay, Topps launched a new brand of sports cards called etopps in December 2000. These cards are sold exclusively online through individual "IPOs" (or, "Initial Player Offering") in which the card is offered for usually a week at the IPO price. The quantity sold depends on how many people offer to buy, but is limited to a certain maximum. After a sale, the cards are held in a climate-controlled warehouse unless the buyer requests delivery, and the cards can be traded online without changing hands except in the virtual sense.

Topps also acquired ThePit.com, a startup company that earlier in 2000 had launched a site for online stock-market style card trading. The purchase was for $5.7 million cash in August 2001 after Topps had earlier committed to invest in a round of venture capital financing for the company. This undertaking was not very successful, however, and Topps unloaded the site on Naxcom in January 2006. The amount of the transaction was not disclosed, but Topps charged a $3.7 million after-tax loss on its books in connection with the sale.

In 2002, Topps revived the T206 set originally released in 1909–11 by the American Tobacco Company under the "Topps 206" brand, with current players. That first revival included the T206 Honus Wagner iconic card, with blue background instead of the original orange. A second revival would be launched in 2010.

Topps grabbed collectors' attention early in 2007 when the new card of Yankees' shortstop Derek Jeter was found to have been altered to include an image of Mickey Mantle standing in the dugout and President George W. Bush walking through the stands.

In 2009, Topps became the first official baseball card of MLB in over thirty years. The first product to fall under the deal was the 2010 Topps Baseball Series 1. The deal gave Topps exclusivity for the use of MLB and club trademarks and logos on cards, stickers and some other products featuring major league players. The exclusive deal was extended in 2013, then extended again in 2018. It is currently scheduled to go through at least 2025.

Again in 2020, the company released a new T206 collection divided into five different series, with the first (50 cards) being released in May 2020. The collection, named "Topps 206", include players from both, Major and Minor League. The fifth series was released in September 2020.

Card design
Although Topps did not invent the concept of baseball cards, its dominance in the field basically allowed the company to define people's expectations of what a baseball card would look like. In addition to establishing a standard size, Topps developed various design elements that are considered typical of baseball cards. Some of these were the company's own innovations, such as the 1971 Football Set, while some were ideas borrowed from others that Topps helped popularize.

Use of statistics
One of the features that contributed significantly to Topps's success beginning with the 1952 set was providing player statistics. At the time, complete and reliable baseball statistics for all players were not widely available, so Topps actually compiled the information itself from published box scores. While baseball cards themselves had been around for years, including statistics was a relative novelty that fascinated many collectors. Those who played with baseball cards could study the numbers and use them as the basis for comparing players, trading cards with friends, or playing imaginary baseball games. It also had some pedagogical benefit by encouraging youngsters to take an interest in the underlying mathematics.

The cards originally had one line for statistics from the most recent year (i.e. the 1951 season for cards in the 1952 set) and another with the player's lifetime totals. Bowman promptly imitated this by putting statistics on its own cards where it had previously only had biographical information. For the first time in 1957, Topps put full year-by-year statistics for the player's entire career on the back of the card. Over the next few years, Topps alternated between this format and merely showing the past season plus career totals. The practice of showing complete career statistics became permanent in 1963, except for one year, 1971, when Topps sacrificed the full statistics in order to put a player photo on the back of the card as well.

Artwork and photography
Although the 1971 set was an aborted experiment in terms of putting photos on card backs (they would not return until 1992), that year was also a landmark in terms of baseball card photography, as Topps for the first time included cards showing color photographs from actual games. The cards themselves had been in color from the beginning, though for the first few years this was done by using artist's portraits of players rather than actual photographs and until 1971, Topps used mostly portrait or posed shots. The 1971 set is also known for its jet black borders, which because they chip so easily, makes it much more difficult to find top grade cards for 1971. The black borders would return for Topps's 1985 football set and 2007 baseball set.

After starting out with simple portraits, in 1954 Topps put two pictures on the front of the card – a hand-tinted 'color' close-up photo of the player's head, and the other a black-and-white full-length pose.  The same basic format was used in 1955, this time with the full-length photo also hand-tinted. For 1956, the close-up tinted photo was placed against a tinted full-background 'game-action' photo of the player.  The close-up head shots of some individual players were reused each year.

From 1957 on, virtually all cards were posed photographs, either as a head shot or together with a typical piece of equipment like a bat or glove. If using such a prop, the player might pose in a position as if he were in the act of batting, pitching, or fielding.  Photographs did not appear in sharp focus and natural color until 1962. However, that year also saw problems with the print quality in the second series, which lacked the right proportion of ink and thus gave the photographs a distinctly greenish tint. The affected series of cards was then reprinted, and several players were actually shown in different poses in the reprinting. Although Topps had produced error cards and variations before, this was its largest single production glitch.

In the absence of full-color action photography, Topps still occasionally used artwork to depict action on a handful of cards. Starting in 1960 a few cards showed true game action, but the photographs were either in black-and-white or hand-tinted color; these cards were primarily highlights from the World Series. In addition to basic cards of individual players, Topps sets commonly include cards for special themes, the 1974 tribute to Hank Aaron as he was about to break Babe Ruth's career home run record being one example. The 1972 set finally included color photographs, which were used for special "In Action" cards of selected star players. Thereafter, Topps began simply mixing game photography with posed shots in its sets.

Baseball artist Dick Perez was commissioned to paint art cards for Topps beginning in 2006. His art card series include Turkey Red and Allen & Ginter.

When used for the cards of individual players, some of the early action photography had awkward results. The photos were sometimes out of focus or included several players, making it difficult to pick out the player who was supposed to be featured on the card. In a few cases, a misidentification meant that the player didn't even appear in the picture. These problems diminished as Topps's selection of photographs gradually improved.

Before statistics, biographical information, and commentary became the dominant element on the backs of cards, Topps also featured artwork there. This primarily involved using various types of cartoons drawn by its stable of artists. These appeared on card backs as late as 1982, but gradually declined in the prominence of their placement and the proportion of cards on which they appeared. In 1993, Topps finally managed again to incorporate a player photo on the back as well as the front of the card, after some competitors had been doing so for a number of years.

Coping with updated developments
The pictures and information on baseball cards sold during one season came primarily from earlier seasons, so Topps used various tactics to give its cards a greater sense of staying current with the times. Before coming up with the idea of a "Traded" set, the company still tried to produce cards of players with their new team if they changed teams in the offseason. This was sometimes accomplished by showing the player without any team cap, or by airbrushing out elements of the former team's logo on his uniform. Cards for rookies could also be prepared by airbrushing over their minor-league uniforms in photos.

In one case, Topps even got too far in front of events, as in 1974 it showed a number of players as being with the "Washington Nat'l Lea." franchise, due to expectations that the San Diego Padres would relocate to the vacant Washington, D.C., market. The team designation was the only change, as no new nickname for the franchise had been selected. When the move failed to materialize, Topps had to replace these with cards showing the players still as Padres.

On rare occasions, Topps has issued special cards for players who had either died or had been injured.  The 1959 set had card 550 as "Symbol Of Courage – Roy Campanella", with a color photo of the paralyzed former Dodger in his wheelchair and a black-and-white photo of him in uniform inserted to the upper left. The 1964 set issued cards for two recently deceased players: Ken Hubbs of the Cubs with a different "In Memoriam" front design compared to standard cards, and Colts pitcher Jim Umbricht's regular card with a special note on the back about his April 1964 death from cancer.  In October 2006, Topps was prepping for its annual updated/traded card release, which featured Cory Lidle in a Yankees uniform.  After Lidle's tragic death, the cards were pulled and subsequently released with "In Memoriam" on its front.

American Football cards

In addition to baseball, Topps also produced cards for American football in 1951, which are known as the Magic set. For football cards Bowman dominated the field, and Topps did not try again until 1955, when it released an All-American set with a mix of active players and retired stars. After buying out Bowman, Topps took over the market the following year.

Since then, Topps sold football cards every season until 2016. However, the emergence of the American Football League (AFL) in 1960 to compete with the established National Football League also allowed Topps's competitors, beginning with Fleer, to make inroads. Fleer produced a set for the AFL in 1960, sets for both leagues for a year, and then began focusing on the AFL again. Philadelphia Gum secured the NFL rights for 1964, forcing Topps to go for the AFL and leaving Fleer with no product in either baseball or football.

Although more competitive for a time, the football card market was never as lucrative as the market for baseball cards, so the other companies did not fight as hard over it. After the AFL–NFL Merger was agreed to, Topps became the only major football card manufacturer beginning in 1968. In spite of the lack of competition, or perhaps to preempt it, Topps also created two sets of cards for the short-lived United States Football League in the 1980s. Many NFL legends had their first ever cards produced in the USFL sets. These players include Steve Young, Jim Kelly, and Reggie White. This resulted in a controversy when these players debuted in the NFL. Many wondered if the USFL cards should be considered rookie cards because the league did not exist anymore. The situation continued until growth in the sports card market generally prompted two new companies, Pro Set and Score, to start making football cards in 1989.

Throughout the 1970s until 1982, Topps did not have the rights to reproduce the actual team logos on the helmets and uniforms of the players; curiously, these could be found on the Fleer sets of the same era, but Fleer could not name specific player names (likely an issue of Topps holding the National Football League Players Association license and Fleer holding the license from the league).  As a result, helmet logos for these teams were airbrushed out on a routine basis.

After the 2015 football season, Panini was awarded an exclusive license by the NFL for producing football cards. 2016 was the first year Topps did not produce football cards since 1955.

Trading cards for other sports
Topps also makes cards for other major North American professional sports. Its next venture was into ice hockey, with a 1954 set featuring players from the four National Hockey League franchises located in the U.S. at the time: the Boston Bruins, Chicago Blackhawks, Detroit Red Wings, and New York Rangers.

In 1958, the O-Pee-Chee Company of London, Ontario, Canada, entered into an agreement with Topps to produce NHL cards (the 1957–58 series) and Canadian football cards (the 1958 series). O-Pee-Chee then started printing its own hockey and football cards in 1961. Similarly, the Topps Company struck agreements with Amalgamated and British Confectionery in the United Kingdom and Scanlen's in Australia.

In 1967, with the major expansion of six new NHL teams to the United States, the Topps Company produced a new hockey card set that paralleled the 1966–67 O-Pee-Chee hockey design (the basic television design was in fact first used for 1966 Topps American football series). Starting in 1968–69, the Topps Company started printing an annual Topps hockey set that was similar to the annual O-Pee-Chee hockey set. The Topps and O-Pee-Chee hockey sets shared a similar design from 1968–69 to 1981–82 and from 1984–85 to 1991–92.

Topps first sold cards for basketball in 1957, but stopped after one season. The company started producing basketball cards again in 1969 and continued until 1982, but then abandoned the market for another decade, missing out on printing the prized rookie cards of Michael Jordan and other mid- and late-1980s National Basketball Association stars. Topps finally returned to basketball cards in 1992, several years after its competitors. This would be perfect timing, because 1992 was the rookie year of Shaquille O'Neal.

In the United Kingdom, where football stickers have been popular over roughly the same period of time as trading cards, Topps acquired the old Amalgamated and British Confectionery firm in 1974, bringing its production methods and card style to Britain. Topps also makes cards for the Scottish Professional Football League. Under its Merlin brand, it has the licence to produce stickers for the Premier League and the national team. Its main competition is the Italian firm Panini. Until 2019, Topps made 'Topps Premier League' stickers and the Match Attax trading card game, and since 2015 it has produced stickers and trading cards for the UEFA Champions League.

In 2008, Topps gained the rights to production of WWE trading cards. The first variation of cards were aptly titled Slam Attax, a play on words of the previously popular football trading card game Match Attax (also made by Topps). The first set was released in late 2008 in the U.K., and it was then later released in the United States in mid-2009. This later proved to be a pattern for subsequent Slam Attax sets and variations, with the U.K. getting an earlier release than the U.S.. After failing to take off, Topps ceased production of Slam Attax cards in the U.S. after only two sets, whilst continuing the line in the U.K. and in Europe where in contrast the brand had become more popular. It remains today one of the longest running Topps brands in the U.K..

In 2008, Topps and Zuffa, LLC signed an exclusive agreement to produce mixed martial arts trading cards. Among the included cards were current and former athletes from the UFC.

Non-sports products

Originally, Topps was purely a gum company, and its first product was simply called "Topps gum". Other gum and candy products followed. In imitation of Bowman and other competitors, Topps eventually began producing humor products unrelated to sports. This included stickers, posters (Wanted Posters, Travel Posters), media tie-ins (Rowan & Martin's Laugh-In), book covers (Batty Bookcovers) and toys (Flying Things), plus offbeat packaging (Garbage Candy). More recently, the company published comic books and games.

Candy and confectionery items
The longest-lived Topps product line remains Bazooka bubble gum, small pieces of gum in patriotic red, white, and blue packaging. Bazooka was introduced in 1947 as a bar of gum that sold for five cents. Unlike the gum sold with baseball cards, it was of better quality and capable of selling on its own merit. In 1953, Topps began selling smaller penny pieces with the Bazooka Joe comic strip on the wrapper as an added attraction.

Even though baseball cards became the company's primary focus during this period, Topps still developed a variety of candy items. For quite a few years, the company stuck within familiar confines, and virtually all of these products involved gum in some way. Sales declined significantly in the 1970s, however, when this relatively hard gum was challenged by Bubble Yum, a new, softer form of bubble gum from Life Savers.

Later, Topps added more candy items without gum. One particular focus has been lollipops, such as Ring Pops. However, Topps has noted that increasing public attention to childhood nutrition undercuts its candy sales. Under pressure by shareholders, the company considered selling off its confectionery business in 2005, but was unable to find a buyer to meet its price and decided to cut management expenses instead.

Other brands include Push Pop, Baby Bottle Pop, and Juicy Drop Pop.

Discontinued products include the Vertigo lollipop, that consisted of a creamy lollipop with a chocolate half and the Wazoo bar.

When the Topps name was sold with the trading card business and entertainment properties to Fanatics, the confectionary business was spun-off as Bazooka Brands, which remains owned by the previous owners.

Non-sports trading cards

As its sports products relied more on photography, Topps redirected its artistic efforts toward non-sports trading cards, on themes inspired by popular culture. For example, the Space Race prompted a set of Space Cards in 1958. Topps has continued to create collectible cards and stickers on a variety of subjects, often targeting the same adolescent male audience as its baseball cards. In particular, these have covered movies, television series, and other cultural phenomena ranging from the Beatles to the life story of John F. Kennedy.  The many Star Wars card series have done well, with a few exceptions.  Future screenwriter Gary Gerani ("Pumpkinhead') joined the company in 1972 and became the editor/writer of almost all movie and television tie-in products, most notably the numerous Star Wars sets, while also creating and helming original card properties such as 1988's Dinosaurs Attack!.

Many Topps artists came from the world of comics and continued to work in that field as well. The shift from sports to other topics better suited the creative instincts of the artists and coincided with turmoil in the comic book industry over regulation by the Comics Code Authority. Beginning at Topps when he was a teenager, Art Spiegelman was the company's main staff cartoonist for more than 20 years. Other staffers in Topps's Product Development Department at various times included Larry Riley, Mark Newgarden, Bhob Stewart and Rick Varesi. Topps's creative directors of Product Development, Woody Gelman and Len Brown, gave freelance assignments to leading comic book illustrators, such as Jack Davis, Wally Wood and Bob Powell. Spiegelman, Gelman and Brown also hired freelance artists from the underground comix movement, including Bill Griffith and Kim Deitch and Robert Crumb. Jay Lynch did extensive cartooning for Topps over several decades.

Drawing on their previous work, these artists were adept at things like mixing humor and horror, as with the Funny Monsters cards in 1959. The 1962 Mars Attacks cards, sketched by Wood and Powell and painted by Norman Saunders, later inspired a Tim Burton movie. A tie-in with the Mars Attacks film led to a 1994 card series, a new 100-card Archives set reprinting the 55 original cards, plus 45 new cards from several different artists, including Norm Saunders' daughter, Zina Saunders.

Among Topps's most notable achievements in the area of satire and parody have been Wacky Packages, a takeoff on various household consumer products, and Garbage Pail Kids, a parody of the Cabbage Patch Kids dolls. Another popular series was the Civil War News set, also with Norman Saunders' artwork.

Earlier, particularly in the early and mid-60s, Topps thrived with several successful series of parody and satire cards for a variety of occasions, usually featuring artists who also worked at Mad magazine.  There were several insult-valentine card series, plus a series of insult epigram cards called Wacky Plaques, several series of well-known-product advertising parody cards, a set of cards featuring the 'mad car-driver cartoons' of artist Big Daddy Roth, and a card-sticker series of fanciful bizarre 'rejected aliens' from other planets, among other semi-subversive outrageous over-the-top concepts designed for the semi-rebellious adolescent boomer market.

Although baseball cards have been Topps's most consistently profitable item, certain fads have occasionally produced spikes in popularity for non-sports items. For a period beginning in 1973, the Wacky Packages stickers managed to outsell Topps baseball cards, becoming the first product to do so since the company's early days as purely a gum and candy maker. Pokémon cards would accomplish the same feat for a few years starting in 1999. In the absence of new fads to capitalize on, Topps has come under pressure from stock analysts, since its sports card business is more stable and has less growth potential.

In 2015 Topps started to expand its non-sports category by adding more TV shows, as well as sci-fi with its brand-new Star Wars line (expanding into its own Topps virtual card app, similar to Topps BUNT), as well as Doctor Who, with regular autographs as well as vintage cut autographs, screen-worn relics, and more.

Disney Channel
Topps worked together with the Disney Channel to create trading cards of High School Musical, High School Musical 2, High School Musical 3, and Hannah Montana.

Comic books

Drawing on its established connections with artists, in 1993 Topps created a division of the company to publish comic books.  Known as Topps Comics, its early efforts included several concepts from retired industry legend Jack Kirby, known collectively as the "Kirbyverse". Topps Comics particularly specialized in licensed titles with tie-ins to movies or television series, though it also published a few original series. Its longest-running and best-selling title was The X-Files, based on the Fox TV show.

These comic books featured former Marvel Comics editor Jim Salicrup as its editor-in-chief. Apart of The X-Files, some of the more famous titles included Lone Ranger and Tonto by Timothy Truman, Xena: Warrior Princess, Mars Attacks, and Zorro, which introduced the famous comics character Lady Rawhide. With sales stagnating, the company decided to pull out of the comics business in 1998.

Games
The Topps Pokémon cards were purely for entertainment, pleasure and collecting, but a new niche of collectible card games was also developing during this period (a Pokémon trading card game was produced simultaneously by Wizards of the Coast). Topps made its first foray into the world of games in July 2003 by acquiring the game company WizKids for $29.4 million in cash, thus acquiring ownership of the rights to the well-known gaming universes of BattleTech and Shadowrun. By inventing yet another niche, the constructible strategy game Pirates of the Spanish Main, this unit managed to reach profitability.  Topps shut down Wizkids operation in November 2008 due to the economic downturn. The brand was acquired by NECA in September 2009.

Controversy 
In 2021, Topps was criticized for its depiction of South Korean boyband BTS in its Grammy-themed collection, which was seen as racist and violent. In response to public backlash, the company apologized and the cards were removed from its production lineup.

Awards

Major League Baseball
Topps All-Star Rookie Team

Minor League Baseball

 Topps Minor League Player of the Year Award – also known as the J. G. Taylor Spink Award
 George M. Trautman Awards – Also in conjunction with Minor League Baseball, Topps presents the George M. Trautman Awards to the Topps Player of the Year in each of sixteen domestic minor leagues.
 Topps Short Season-A/Rookie All-Star Team

See also
Topps baseball card products
Allen & Ginter
Bowman
Donruss
Fleer
Razor Entertainment
Upper Deck Company

Notes

References

Sources
 Bowman Gum, Inc. v. Topps Chewing Gum, Inc., 103 F.Supp. 944 (E.D.N.Y. 1952).
 Boyd, Brendan C. & Fred C. Harris (1973). The Great American Baseball Card Flipping, Trading and Bubble Gum Book. Boston: Little, Brown and Company. .
 Caple, Jim. "A card fan's dream come true". ESPN.com Page 2, July 25, 2006.
 Fleer Corp. v. Topps Chewing Gum, Inc., 501 F.Supp. 485 (E.D. Pa. 1980).
 Fleer Corp. v. Topps Chewing Gum, Inc., 658 F.2d 139 (3d Cir. 1981).
 Haelan Laboratories, Inc. v. Topps Chewing Gum, Inc., 202 F.2d 866 (2d Cir. 1953).
 Haelan Laboratories, Inc. v. Topps Chewing Gum Co., 112 F.Supp. 904 (E.D.N.Y. 1953).
 Schwartz, Ben. "Culture Jamming for the Swingset Set". Chicago Reader, June 25, 2004.
 Schwarz, Alan (2004). The Numbers Game: Baseball's Lifelong Fascination with Statistics. New York: St. Martin's Press. .
 Slocum, Frank & Red Foley (1990). Topps Baseball Cards: The complete picture collection, a 40 year history. New York: Warner Books.
 Smith, Aaron. "Mickey Mantle or Martha?" CNN/Money, March 24, 2005.
 Thompson, Wright. "Investors gear up for takeover". ESPN.com Page 2, July 27, 2006.

External links

 
 Topps facts from USA Today
 Sy Berger: Father of the modern baseball card

 
Trading card companies
Food and drink companies established in 1938
Confectionery companies of the United States
Madison Dearborn Partners companies
Private equity portfolio companies
Design companies established in 1938
1938 establishments in New York (state)
2022 mergers and acquisitions